Penryn is a Cornish word meaning 'headland' that may refer to:
Penryn, Cornwall, United Kingdom, a town of about 7,000 on the Penryn River
Penryn railway station, a station on the Maritime Line between Truro and Falmouth Docks, and serves the town of Penryn, Cornwall
Penryn Campus is a university campus in Penryn, Cornwall
Penryn (UK Parliament constituency) a former constituency based on Penryn, Cornwall
Penryn RFC, an English and Cornish rugby union club based in the town of the same name 
Penryn, California, in the United States, a town of 831, and home to a granite quarry
Penryn (microarchitecture), code name for a CPU core from Intel, used in Core 2 Duo
Penryn (microprocessor), code name for a microprocessor die from Intel, used in mobile Core 2 Duo

Penrhyn is a Welsh word meaning 'headland' that may refer to:
Penrhyn, Anglesey, a village in Anglesey, North Wales
Baron Penrhyn, a title of peerage
Penrhyn Bay, a small town on the North Wales coast
Penrhyn Castle, a country house in North Wales
Penrhyn Castle Railway Museum
Penrhyn (atoll), in the Cook Islands in the South Pacific
Penrhyn, Ipswich, a heritage-listed house in Queensland, Australia
Penrhyn Quarry, a slate quarry near Bethesda in North Wales
Penrhyn Quarry Railway, a railway serving the Penrhyn Quarry
Penrhyn railway station, a station serving the village of Penrhyndeudraeth on the Ffestiniog Railway
Port Penrhyn, a port serving the Penrhyn Quarry
Penrhyn-coch, a village in Ceredigion, West Wales

See also
Penrhyndeudraeth, a village near Porthmadog, Gwynedd
Penrhyn language, a language spoken in the Cook Islands